Rahman Ali (born Rudolph Valentino Clay; July 18, 1944) is an American former heavyweight boxer. He is the younger brother of  Muhammad Ali.

Biography
Ali was born to Cassius Marcellus Clay Sr. and Odessa Clay on July 18, 1944, 15 months after his brother Cassius.  Muhammad started boxing in a Louisville, Kentucky amateur boxing league. While he went to the 1960 Olympics, Rahman was not selected and remained amateur until February 25, 1964, the night his brother won one of his heavyweight titles over Sonny Liston. As a professional boxer, Rahman won 14 bouts, lost 3, and had one draw. In his career, he knocked out seven opponents and was himself knocked out once. After back-to-back losses ending with Rahaman being knocked out by Jack O'Halloran, he retired from professional boxing. Rahaman released his autobiography on January 17, 2015, with a book titled, That's Muhammad Ali's Brother! My Life on the Undercard, which is co-authored by H. Ron Brashear and the foreword written by Gene Kilroy - the longtime business manager of Muhammad Ali. In 2019, Rahaman released his 2nd book titled My Brother, Muhammad Ali - The Definitive Biography.  It is co-authored by Fiaz Rafiq, with the foreword written by NFL legend Jim Brown.  The book is currently published in eight different languages around the world.

Professional boxing record

|-
|style="text-align:center;" colspan=8|14 wins (7 knockouts, 7 decisions), 3 losses (1 knockout, 2 decisions), 1 draw
|-style="text-align:center; background:#e3e3e3;"
| style="border-style: none none solid solid;" | Result
| style="border-style: none none solid solid;" | Record
| style="border-style: none none solid solid;" | Opponent
| style="border-style: none none solid solid;" | Type
| style="border-style: none none solid solid;" | Round
| style="border-style: none none solid solid;" | Date
| style="border-style: none none solid solid;" | Location
|- align=center
| Loss
| 
| align=left |  Jack O'Halloran
| KO
| 8
| 
| align=left |  San Diego, California
|- align=center
| Loss
| 
| align=left |  Roy Wallace
| PTS
| 10
| 1972-05-08
| align=left |  Niles, Ohio
|- align=center
| Draw
| 
| align=left |  Jasper Evans
| PTS
| 10
| 1972-01-22
| align=left |  Denver, Colorado
|- align=center
| Win
| 
| align=left |  Joe "Toy Block" Byrd
| TKO
| 4
| 1971-12-16
| align=left |  Kalamazoo, Michigan
|- align=center
| Win
| 
| align=left |  Harold "70's Version" Carter
| TKO
| 3
| 1971-10-27
| align=left |  O'Hare Port Hotel, Chicago, Illinois
|- align=center
| Win
| 
| align=left |  Larry Beilfuss
| TKO
| 2
| 1971-09-13
| align=left |  Milwaukee Auditorium, Milwaukee, Wisconsin
|- align=center
| Win
| 
| align=left |  Carl "Tank" Baker
| MD
| 10
| 1971-04-30
| align=left |  Port of Spain
|- align=center
| Win
| 
| align=left |  Peter Robinson
| TKO
| 2
| 1971-04-23
| align=left |  Port of Spain
|- align=center
| Win
| 
| align=left |  Stamford Harris
| PTS
| 10
| 1971-04-16
| align=left |  Port of Spain
|- align=center
| Win
| 
| align=left | Clement Greenidge
| PTS
| 10
| 1971-04-09
| align=left |  Port of Spain
|- align=center
| Loss
| 
| align=left |  Danny McAlinden
| PTS
| 6
| 1971-03-08
| align=left |  Madison Square Garden, New York City
|- align=center
| Win
| 
| align=left |  Howard Darlington
| PTS
| 4
| 1970-12-07
| align=left |  Madison Square Garden, New York City
|- align=center
| Win
| 
| align=left | Hurricane Grant
| KO
| 3
| 1970-10-26
| align=left |  Atlanta City Auditorium, Atlanta, Georgia
|- align=center
| Win
| 
| align=left |  Tommy Howard
| UD
| 10
| 1970-08-11
| align=left |  Miami Beach Auditorium, Miami Beach, Florida
|- align=center
| Win
| 
| align=left | Fairchild Hope
| TKO
| 2
| 1966-02-11
| align=left |  Nassau
|- align=center
| Win
| 
| align=left | Buster Reed
| KO
| 2
| 1965-05-25
| align=left |  St. Dominic's Hall, Lewiston, Maine
|- align=center
| Win
| 
| align=left |  Levi Forte
| UD
| 10
| 1965-04-28
| align=left |  Miami Beach Auditorium, Miami Beach, Florida
|- align=center
| Win
| 
| align=left |  Chip Johnson
| PTS
| 4
| 1964-02-25
| align=left |  Miami Beach Auditorium, Miami Beach, Florida

Exhibition boxing record

References

External links
 

1944 births
Living people
20th-century Muslims
21st-century Muslims
African-American boxers
African-American Muslims
American male boxers
American people of English descent
American people of Irish descent
American people of Malagasy descent
Boxers from Louisville, Kentucky
Converts to Sunni Islam from Protestantism
Muhammad Ali family
Heavyweight boxers